Lirularia redimita is a species of minute sea snail, a marine gastropod mollusk or micromollusk in the family Trochidae, the top snails.

Description
The height of the shell attains 3⅔ mm, its diameter 4 mm. The depressed, orbicular shell is narrowly perforated. It is greenish-pearly and iridescent. The lirae are ornamented with black. The apex is white. The 4½ whorls are rather convex. They are encircled by 3 or 4 lirae or carinae (on the body whorl about 12, slenderer below). The white umbilicus is small. The large, pearly aperture is circular. The columella is white, somewhat reflexed above, joining the outer lip with a thin callus.

The green pearly surface with the black-dotted spiral keels make the shell of this species immediately recognizable.

Distribution
This marine species occurs off Japan.

References

 Higo, S., Callomon, P. & Goto, Y. (1999) Catalogue and Bibliography of the Marine Shell-Bearing Mollusca of Japan. Elle Scientific Publications, Yao, Japan, 749 pp.

External links
 To World Register of Marine Species

redimita
Gastropods described in 1861